The 2005–06 Serbia and Montenegro Cup was the fourth and last season of the Serbia and Montenegro's annual football cup before the dissolution. The cup defenders should be Železnik, but the club was merged with Voždovac. Red Star Belgrade has last winner of the competition, after they defeated OFK Beograd. She later clinched the Meridian SuperLiga title to claim its 9th domestic double.

First round
Thirty-two teams entered in the First Round. The matches were played on 20, 21, 27, 28 September and 19 October 2005.

|}
Note: Roman numerals in brackets denote the league tier the clubs participated in the 2005–06 season.

Second round
The 16 winners from the prior round enter this round. The matches were played on 26 October 2005.

|}
Note: Roman numerals in brackets denote the league tier the clubs participated in the 2005–06 season.

Quarter-finals
The eight winners from the prior round enter this round. The matches were played on 7 December 2005.

|}
Note: Roman numerals in brackets denote the league tier the clubs participated in the 2005–06 season.

Semi-finals

Note: Roman numerals in brackets denote the league tier the clubs participated in the 2005–06 season.

Final

See also
 2005–06 Serbia and Montenegro SuperLiga

References

External links
Results on RSSSF

Serbia and Montenegro Cup
Cup
Cup
Serbia